Tche Tche café (stylized as TCHETCHE) is an Amman, Jordan-based coffeehouse chain. It started as a small cafe in Amman, Jordan in 1998, and became so popular that it grew to 28 outlets spread all over the Middle East region. As Jordan's most popular cafe and casual dining chain, Tche Tche is the first Jordanian cafe to successfully expand regionally. Today TCHE TCHE has branches in Dubai, Abu Dhabi, Kuwait, Egypt and Oman, in addition to the thirteen existing outlets in Jordan.

Overview

TCHE TCHE café operates as a cafe in Amman. It offers breakfast, snacks, salads, sandwiches, grilled pasta, pizzas, desserts, hot drinks, and cold drinks. The company was founded in 1998 and is based in Abu Dhabi, United Arab Emirates. It has branches in Jordan, the United Arab Emirates, Kuwait, Egypt, Palestine, Oman, Kingdom of Saudi Arabia, Iraq, and Lebanon.

TCHE TCHE is one of the leading restaurant chains in the region.

There are  more than 32 branches of TCHE TCHE located throughout the Middle East, including an outlet in Ramallah, "a favourite spot" among Palestinian youth.

Locations
As of October 2021, TCHE TCHE has 41 outlets in nine countries.

 (1 outlets)
 (7)
 (2)
 (1)
 (2)
 (1)
 (2)
 
 (5)

References

External links
Official website

Regional restaurant chains